Rudolf Johansson (12 April 1899 – 28 November 1994) was a Swedish middle-distance runner. He competed in the men's 800 metres at the 1924 Summer Olympics.

References

External links
 

1899 births
1994 deaths
Athletes (track and field) at the 1924 Summer Olympics
Swedish male middle-distance runners
Olympic athletes of Sweden
Place of birth missing